Silvia Rupil (born May 15, 1985) is an Italian cross-country skier. She has competed in the World Cup since 2006, and competed in the 2009-10 Tour de Ski and the 2010 Winter Olympics. Her best World Cup result is a sixth place at a 6 km freestyle event in Canmore in 2010. In her Olympic debut, Rupil finished fourth in the relay, 14th in the 10 km freestyle event, and 16th in the 7.5 km + 7.5 km double pursuit event.

Cross-country skiing results
All results are sourced from the International Ski Federation (FIS).

Olympic Games

World Championships

World Cup

Season standings

Team podiums
 1 victory – (1 )
 3 podiums – (3 )

References

External links

1985 births
Cross-country skiers at the 2010 Winter Olympics
Italian female cross-country skiers
Living people
Olympic cross-country skiers of Italy
Cross-country skiers of Fiamme Gialle